The 2006 Barnet Council election took place on 4 May 2006 to elect members of Barnet London Borough Council in London, England. The whole council was up for election and the Conservative party stayed in overall control of the council.

Background
The last election in 2002 saw the Conservatives gain a majority of seats after winning 33 seats, compared to 24 for Labour and 6 Liberal Democrats. In December 2005 the Liberal Democrats gained a seat in High Barnet from the Conservatives in a by-election, after having come third in the ward in 2002. This meant that before the election the Conservatives had 31 seats, the Labour party 24, Liberal Democrats 7 and 1, formerly Conservative, seat was vacant.

A total of 219 candidates stood in the election for the 63 seat being contested across 21 wards. These included a full slate from the Conservative and Labour parties, while the Liberal Democrats had 3 candidates in all but one ward. Other candidates included the Green Party who stood at least one candidate in each ward, as well as 3 from the United Kingdom Independence Party, 1 Victory United candidate and 2 independents. 14 councillors did not stand for re-election and a further 1, Daniel Hope, stood in a different ward.

Election result
The results saw the Conservatives increase their majority to 11 after winning 37 of the 63 seats. Overall turnout in the election was 41.65%, an increase on the 2002 election turnout of 34%. This turnout included 33,892 postal votes, a rise from 29,195 in 2002.

Following the election the Conservative leader of the council, Brian Salinger, lost a vote of no confidence in the Conservative group by 21 votes to 16 and was replaced as leader by his deputy Mike Freer.

|}

Ward results

Brunswick Park

Burnt Oak

Childs Hill

Colindale

Coppetts

East Barnet

East Finchley

Edgware

Finchley Church End

Garden Suburb

Golders Green

Hale

Hendon

High Barnet

Mill Hill

Oakleigh

Totteridge

Underhill

West Finchley

West Hendon

Woodhouse

By-elections between 2006 and 2010

East Barnet

Cllr. Olwen Evans died on 25 December 2006 after a long battle with cancer. She had served East Barnet Ward as a councillor for 24 years (1978-1994 and 1998–2006).
Turnout was reasonable but lower than usual for this ward due to snowfall on the day of the election, which closed many schools and curtailed refuse collection.

Hale

The by-election was called following the resignation of Cllr Jane Ellison.

Edgware

The by-election was called following the resignation of Cllr. Richard F. Weider.

Totteridge

The by-election was called following the resignation of Cllr. Caroline S. Margo.

References

2006
2006 London Borough council elections